J-body may refer to:

Automobile component sets 
 J body, Chrysler J platform
 J-body, GM J platform